Arthur D. Lander, M.D., Ph.D. is Director of the Center for Complex Biological Systems at the University of California, Irvine.

Education
He was born in Brooklyn, New York, and is an alumnus of John Dewey High School there. He received a Bachelor of Arts from Yale University and a combined M.D., Ph.D. from the University of California, San Francisco, under  the direction of Louis Reichardt. His first faculty position was jointly in the Department of Brain and Cognitive Sciences and the Department of Biology at Massachusetts Institute of Technology. He moved as Professor to Irvine in 1995.

Research
Lander's research is focused on the Systems Biology of Development, and deals with topics in Developmental Biology, Cell Biology, Mathematical & Computational Biology, Glycobiology, Neurobiology, and Engineering for example, of Laminin.

Academic service
Lander serves on the editorial boards of PLOS Biology and the Journal of Biology, is a member of the American Society for Clinical Investigation, a fellow of the American Association for the Advancement of Science, and a member of the Science Board of the Santa Fe Institute (SFI).

Personal

His brother, Eric Lander, is a geneticist and Professor of Biology at the Massachusetts Institute of Technology (MIT), former member of the Whitehead Institute, and founding director of the Broad Institute of MIT and Harvard. His wife, Anne Calof, is a professor in the Department of Anatomy & Neurobiology at Irvine.

References

Further reading
 Member profile in American Society for Cell Biology Newsletter, 2001.

Living people
John Dewey High School alumni
Yale University alumni
University of California, San Francisco alumni
Santa Fe Institute people
21st-century American biologists
Fellows of the American Association for the Advancement of Science
Scientists from New York (state)
1958 births